Hydrellia personata is a species of shore flies in the family Ephydridae.

Distribustion
United States.

References

Ephydridae
Insects described in 1971
Diptera of North America